Vojtěch Dobiáš (born July 18, 2000) is a Czech professional ice hockey forward. He is currently playing for HC ZUBR Přerov of the Chance Liga on loan from PSG Berani Zlín.

Dobias has been a member of Berani Zlín since 2014 where he featured in their various academies. His first exposure to the professional ranks came with a loan spell at LHK Jestřábi Prostějov during the 2018–19 season where he played six games. He made his senior debut for Zlín during the 2019–20 Czech Extraliga season, playing two games, and signed an extension with the team on April 24, 2000.

References

External links

2000 births
Living people
Czech ice hockey forwards
SHK Hodonín players
LHK Jestřábi Prostějov players
People from Uherské Hradiště
HC ZUBR Přerov players
PSG Berani Zlín players
Sportspeople from the Zlín Region